The Allen Memorial Art Museum (AMAM) is an art museum located in Oberlin, Ohio, and it is run by Oberlin College. Founded in 1917, the collection contains over 15,000 works of art.

Overview
The AMAM is primarily a teaching museum and is aimed at the students, faculty and staff of Oberlin College, in addition to the surrounding community. Notable strengths include seventeenth-century Dutch and Flemish art, nineteenth and early twentieth-century European and contemporary American art, as well as Asian, European and American works on paper. The collection is housed in an Italian Renaissance-style building designed by Cass Gilbert and named after its founder, Dr. Dudley Peter Allen (B.A., 1875), a graduate and trustee of Oberlin College and the first husband of Elisabeth Severance Prentiss, whose bequest as Mrs. F. F. Prentiss included parts of her art collection started during her first marriage.

In 1977, Robert Venturi and Denise Scott Brown designed an addition that represents one of the earliest examples of postmodern architecture in the United States. In 2011, the historic museum underwent a two-year retrofit, after which it was awarded with USGBC LEED Gold certification.

Collections

The Allen Memorial Art Museum has a collection of more than 15,000 objects – including paintings, sculpture, decorative arts, prints, drawings and photographs – that provide a comprehensive overview of the history of art from a variety of cultures.  The collection has a focus on European and American paintings and sculpture from the 15th century to today, and also has holdings of Asian paintings, scrolls, sculpture and decorative art, including a large group of Ukiyo-e prints.

Ancient Egyptian, Greek, Roman, African and Pre-Columbian art is represented. The museum also houses the Eva Hesse archives, which includes the artist’s notebooks, diaries, photographs and letters, and it oversees, along with the Art Department, Frank Lloyd Wright's Weltzheimer/Johnson House.

Prentiss Fund
Purchases made through the Mrs. F.F. Prentiss Fund include a Henry Moore sculpture and other works:

Art rental
At the beginning of every semester, students camp out in front of the north gate of the museum to get first pick of original etchings, lithographs and paintings by artists including Pierre-Auguste Renoir, Andy Warhol, Salvador Dalí, and Pablo Picasso. For five dollars per semester, students can hang these works on their dorm room walls.

The program was started in the 1940s by Ellen H. Johnson, a professor of art at Oberlin, in order to "develop the aesthetic sensibilities of students and encourage ordered thinking and discrimination in other areas of their lives."

References

External links

Bulletin of the Allen Memorial Art Museum

 
Art museums and galleries in Ohio
Cass Gilbert buildings
Museums in Lorain County, Ohio
University museums in Ohio
Institutions accredited by the American Alliance of Museums
Art museums established in 1917
Museums of American art
1917 establishments in Ohio
Renaissance Revival architecture in Ohio
Postmodern architecture in Ohio